The 1921 Wyoming Cowboys football team was an American football team that represented the University of Wyoming as a member of the Rocky Mountain Conference (RMC) during the 1921 college football season. In their sixth season under head coach John Corbett, the Cowboys compiled a 1–4–2 record (1–3–2 against conference opponents), finished seventh in the RMC, and were outscored by a total of 92 to 39. Robert Steele Wilson was the team captain.

Schedule

References

Wyoming
Wyoming Cowboys football seasons
Wyoming Cowboys football